Owensburg is an unincorporated community and census-designated place (CDP) in Jackson Township, Greene County, Indiana, United States. It was named in honor of the Owens family of early settlers. As of the 2010 census it had a population of 406.

Geography
The southern border of the CDP follows the Martin County line, and the western edge of the CDP follows Indiana State Road 45. State Road 58 passes through the center of Owensburg, leading east  to Bedford and west with State Road 45  to Interstate 69 and U.S. Route 231 near Scotland.

The center of Owensburg is in the valley of Town Branch, which flows east to Indian Creek, a tributary of East Fork of the White River and part of the Wabash River watershed.

Demographics

References

Census-designated places in Greene County, Indiana
Census-designated places in Indiana
Bloomington metropolitan area, Indiana